Andrejs Rubins (26 November 1978 – 1 August 2022) was a Latvian professional footballer who played as a left midfielder. He was a member of the Latvia national team. Rubins worked as a football manager.

Club career
Born in Riga, Rubins started his career in 1996 at FK Auda in the Latvian 2nd Division. The following year he moved to Sweden with Östers IF, where he made 11 league appearances before moving back to Latvia in 1998 to play for Skonto Riga. He played there for the next three seasons, and managed to win three consecutive league titles in a row. He also won the Latvian Cup twice. All in all, over those three seasons he helped his team, scoring 14 goals in 67 league matches.

In 2000 Rubins moved to England, joining English Football League First Division club Crystal Palace. He made just 31 appearances in three seasons at the club but still managed to impress, scoring twice in the League Cup against Leicester City and Liverpool.

In December 2002 Rubins moved to Russia initially to play for Spartak Moscow in the Russian Premier League on a free transfer. However, three months later, without playing a game, he moved to Shinnik Yaroslavl, where he played 51 games in two seasons, scoring 4 times. In January 2005 Rubins signed a four-year contract with Spartak Moscow, who were then managed by Latvian manager Aleksandrs Starkovs. After struggling to settle he made just five appearances, and the club sent him on loan back to Shinnik Yaroslavl in January 2006 for 12 months.

In June 2007 he was linked with another loan move, this time with English Football League Championship club, Blackpool,
 but he eventually went on loan to the Latvian Higher League club FK Liepājas Metalurgs on 27 July for six months. He was released by Metalurgs together with his international team-mate Imants Bleidelis after half-season for unexplained reasons. Bleidelis retired from professional football then, but Rubins signed a contract with the Azerbaijan Premier League club Inter Baku in August 2008. He spent two successful seasons there, becoming a vital starting eleven player for the club, scoring nine goals in 49 league games. Rubins also managed to become the champion of Azerbaijan in the 2009–10 with Inter.

He started the 2010–11 season in another Azerbaijan Premier League club FK Qarabağ from Aghdam, joining on a two-year contract on a free transfer. Andrejs suffered several injuries that caused limited game time and he only managed to appear in 12 league games and was released at the end of the season. In 2011, he was signed by Azerbaijan Premier League club Simurq PFC. Rubins scored one goal in 18 matches for the club, and in July 2012 he was released.

Struggling with a long-term hip injury, Rubins announced his retirement from professional football on 13 March 2013, saying: "If I cannot play for 100%, that's not worth it."

International career
Rubins made his international debut for the Latvia national team on 10 November 1998 in a friendly match 3–0 loss against Tunisia. With 117 international caps he is the second most capped player in the history of Latvia national team, 50 matches short of Vitālijs Astafjevs. Rubins also participated at the EURO 2004 in Portugal.

Coaching career
After his retirement Rubins started coaching children and youngsters in Ikšķile. Prior to the 2014 Latvian First League season Rubins was appointed the assistant manager of FK Ogre.

As of 2022 he was an assistant coach to FK Spartaks Jūrmala.

Death
Rubins died on 1 August 2022, the Latvian Football Federation announced his death on 3 August.

Career statistics

Honours
Skonto
 Virslīga: 1998, 1999, 2000
 Latvian Cup: 1998, 2000; runners-up 1999

Spartak Moscow
 Russian Premier League runners-up: 2005

Liepājas Metalurgs
 Virslīga runners-up: 2007
 Baltic League: 2007

Inter Baku
 Azerbaijan Premier League 2009–10; runners-up 2008–09

Latvia
 Baltic Cup: 2001, 2003

See also
 List of men's footballers with 100 or more international caps

References

External links
 
 
 Andrejs Rubins at Latvian Football Federation 

1978 births
2022 deaths
Latvian people of Russian descent
Footballers from Riga
Latvian footballers
Association football midfielders
Latvia international footballers
FIFA Century Club
Allsvenskan players
English Football League players
Russian Premier League players
Azerbaijan Premier League players
Östers IF players
FC Spartak Moscow players
FC Shinnik Yaroslavl players
Crystal Palace F.C. players
UEFA Euro 2004 players
Skonto FC players
Latvian Higher League players
FK Liepājas Metalurgs players
Shamakhi FK players
Qarabağ FK players
Simurq PIK players
Latvian expatriate footballers
Latvian expatriate sportspeople in Sweden
Expatriate footballers in Sweden
Latvian expatriate sportspeople in Russia
Expatriate footballers in Russia
Latvian expatriate sportspeople in Azerbaijan
Expatriate footballers in Azerbaijan
Latvian expatriate sportspeople in England
Expatriate footballers in England
Latvian football managers